Carpenter Body Works (typically referred to simply as Carpenter) is a defunct American bus manufacturer.  Founded in 1918 in Mitchell, Indiana, the company produced a variety of vehicles, with the majority of production consisting of yellow school buses for the United States and Canada.

Remaining a family-owned company into the late 1980s, Carpenter entered bankruptcy at the end of 1989 and was forced to reorganize to survive.  In 1995, the company relocated to the former Wayne Corporation facilities in Richmond, Indiana; in 1996, the company rebranded its product line as "Crown by Carpenter".  In 1998, Carpenter was acquired by specialty vehicle manufacturer Spartan Motors.

In early 2001, Carpenter ended vehicle production, as its market share declined further.

History

Foundation
Carpenter traces its roots to 1918, in Mitchell, Indiana.  Local blacksmith Ralph H. Carpenter established his own blacksmith works; at the time, part of the business involved building and repairing horse-drawn wagons.  At the time, in many rural areas, these were still adapted to carry people simply with the addition of wooden benches.  Inspired by the merger of two local school systems in the area near Mitchell, in 1922, Carpenter shifted from repair to construction of new bodies, constructing his first wooden-bodied "kid hack".  By the mid-1920s, motorized truck chassis formed the basis of all vehicle bodies.  Although still constructed primarily of wood, the new bus bodies were now reinforced by steel in the exterior and framing.

In 1935, the combination of wood and metal construction was replaced by a body built solely of steel; the roof panels were welded together instead of riveted, forming a single panel.  At the same time, the company debuted an early form of the school bus stop arm, though in a much different form: instead of a stop sign, the company used a clenched fist with a red-painted index finger that was propped out from the side of the bus.  In 1937, Ralph Carpenter reincorporated his business as Carpenter Body Works, expanding into a larger factory in Mitchell in 1939.  In 1941, the company became one of the first publicly owned bus manufacturers.

During the World War II moratorium on private-sector vehicle manufacturing, Carpenter became a bus supplier for the US Army and US Navy, becoming a source of buses for military training facilities across the United States.

1950s–1980: Reconstruction and Expansion

In May 1947, the Carpenter factory in Mitchell, Indiana, was heavily damaged by a fire in the paint shop.

In 1954, Carpenter produced its first transit-style "forward-control" bus. Similar to designs from Blue Bird and Wayne, the company used Marmon-Herrington as its chassis supplier.  As with other manufacturers, Carpenter conventional-style buses in the early 1950s were available on a variety of chassis, including Chevrolet/GMC, Ford, Dodge, International Harvester, Mack, REO, Diamond T, Studebaker, and White.

In March 1956, the Carpenter factory was again struck by fire, starting on the body-fitment station.  Causing nearly $750,000 in damage, much of the factory was destroyed, except for the warehouse, upholstery shop, and paint shop; approximately two dozen buses were driven away from the fire to safety.  With the help of factory workers, the factory was rebuilt and expanded in just 89 days.  During the reconstruction, some workers worked without pay until later compensated.

Following the 1963 death of Ralph Carpenter at age 85, leadership of the company transferred to his son-in-law John A. Foddrill.

To the end of the 1960s, Carpenter continued to produce its school bus product line as it had since the 1920s: every vehicle was essentially built one at time without an assembly line and essentially to order.  Although one of the larger school bus manufacturers, Carpenter allowed for a great deal of specialization and available options for a purchaser.

In 1969, Carpenter became one of the first manufacturers to offer a downsized school bus (25-30 passengers) for smaller-scale operators.  Based on the General Motors P-chassis, the Carpenter Cadet CV utilized the roof and the body of the conventional-body Carpenter from the entry door rearward.  From the drivers' seat forward, the Cadet was designed similar to the GM "stepvan".  The Cadet would spawn a number of similar designs from other manufacturers, remaining in production for 29 years.

In 1970, Carpenter upgraded its transit-style school buses with the introduction of the Corsair; the Marmon-Herrington chassis was replaced by a Hendrickson chassis.  In addition, a distinguishing feature of the Corsair was its wraparound curved "fishbowl" windshield.  Along with the forward-control Corsair, an all-new rear-engine model made its debut.

In 1970, parts of the factory were expanded further; under a company objective, management sought to source nearly all materials for the construction within Indiana (only carpet had to be sourced out of state)

During much of 1978, production at the Mitchell, Indiana facility was halted by a 6-month long labor strike lasting from February to August.

1981–90: Financial Decline

As the 1970s turned into the 1980s, a critical factor affecting school bus manufacturing was declining student populations; the baby boomer generation that had attended schools for the past 25 years were now on the verge of all completing their secondary education.  Overcapacity and lowered demand in the bus manufacturing industry was coupled with the unstable economy of the time.  The company unsuccessfully attempted to diversify into the small transit bus market.

In 1981, Carpenter made its first move in expanding beyond its Mitchell, Indiana home.  After securing over $1 million in loans, the company opened a machine shop in North Vernon, Indiana.  In addition, in moving into the mass-transit market, Carpenter introduced the CBW range.  A rear-engine mass-transit bus designed in 30 and 35-feet lengths, large orders for the CBW were received from the Southern California Rapid Transit District (Los Angeles), the Chicago Transit Authority and New Orleans RTA.

In 1983, the forward-control version of the Corsair was replaced by a far more modern Cavalier.  Based on an International Harvester chassis, the Cavalier improved driver usability and ergonomics over its predecessor.  As it was sold in limited numbers, the rear-engine Corsair remained in production.

In 1984, the Carpenter conventional (now called the Classic) received its most extensive updates in nearly 20 years.  After fewer than 150 buses were sold, sales of the CBW mass-transit line were discontinued in that year.

In 1985, the company opened a chassis-manufacturing plant in Seymour, Indiana, although the plant would close within a year.  In an expansion of the model line, Carpenter became one of the last major manufacturers (alongside Ward/AmTran) to introduce a school bus based on a cutaway van as it introduced the Clipper in 1985.  The Clipper was a dual rear-wheel design sold primarily on a Chevrolet/GMC chassis.

In 1988, due to escalating costs, the North Vernon machine shop was closed down.

In 1989, the Cavalier was replaced by the Counselor, as the International Harvester chassis was replaced by a GMC chassis.  For the last time, the rear-engine Corsair was produced.

In December 1989, with nearly $14 million in unpaid debt, Carpenter Body Works was forced to declare Chapter 11 bankruptcy.  In 1990, Indianapolis-based businessman Dr. Beurt SerVaas formed a holding company (CBW, Inc) to acquire Carpenter Body Works.  Although the company board (consisting primarily of the Foddrill family and supporters) were in favor of the acquisition, the United Auto Workers labor force rejected the proposal, due to massive labor concessions; it would take two weeks for an agreement to take place.

1991–2001:  Struggle for identity 

As it entered the 1990s, Carpenter was no longer a family-owned company, transitioning into the leadership formed by Dr. SerVaas.  During the acquisition, the product line was called "the Cadillac of school buses"; as such, the company had high hopes for the future based on its moves early in the 1990s.

In May 1991, Carpenter purchased the tooling, product rights, and intellectual property of Crown Coach, a California-based manufacturer that had closed its doors two months prior.  The original intent of the company was to restart production of the Crown Supercoach Series II under the Carpenter name, but the complexity of its unibody construction proved too expensive for mass production (the purchase price of the original Series II was over $125,000 in 1990, nearly twice as high as a competitive Blue Bird or Thomas).  Introduced in 1989, the Series II had been the most updated bus from Crown Coach in 40 years.  While Carpenter would have to shelve the Supercoach II as a whole, it did not go unnoticed.  A number of elements were carried over for the bus that was brought to market in its place.

Introduced for 1992, the Carpenter Coach RE (Rear Engine) also served as the replacement for the long-running Corsair.  Far more modern than its predecessor, the Coach utilized a chassis manufactured by the Crane Carrier Company of Tulsa, OK and was equipped with a Detroit Diesel 6v92 coupled with an Allison transmission. A minor change was added as the Clipper was renamed the Classmate.

In 1994, Carpenter leased the former Wayne plant in Richmond, Indiana and began producing RE and FE chassis. Though the Crane Carrier chassis designs were produced initially, Carpenter designed chassis were rapidly phased into production. In a joint venture, Carpenter expanded its cutaway-van model line by distributing single rear-wheel buses manufactured by Quebec-based manufacturer Les Enterprises Michel Corbeil (badged as both Carpenter and Corbeil vehicles).

Crown by Carpenter (1996–99)

As part of the 1991 purchase of the Crown Coach intellectual property, Carpenter inherited the rights to the Crown brand name.  While the Crown-influenced Coach RE was not a success (its production lasting from 1992 to 1993), Carpenter used the Crown brand name in the late 1990s in an attempt to re-brand itself.  Starting in 1996, all Carpenter buses were sold under the brand "Crown by Carpenter".

In 1996, Carpenter contracted Spartan Motors to build its RE and FE chassis in Charlotte, MI and moved its body building operations from its aging Mitchell facility to Richmond. During this transition, Carpenter revised the body design of all of its buses.  The changes included a new roof design with single-piece roof bows and revised rubrails (full-length upper rubrails).  The Wayne Lifeguard would donate some of its parts to the Crown Classic, including its windshield, entry door, and driver's switch panel.

Crown By Carpenter sold a lineup of two Type A buses (Classmate SW/DW), one Type B bus (the Cadet), one Type C bus (the Classic), and two Type D buses (FE/RE, dropping the Counselor name).

At the new location, Carpenter had the advantage of an established team. Both the leadership and workforce based at Richmond included a number of veterans of the former Wayne operations. As such, they brought considerable experience and knowledge of the plant and industry to the effort.  In adapting to the equipment at the Richmond plant, a change to the techniques of welding the roof joints from the procedures used before at Mitchell would later prove vital in excluding Crown by Carpenter products from containing a crucial structural flaw.  That situation was not envisioned by anyone then and would only become an issue nearly a decade in the future.

One innovation that Carpenter introduced during this period was a change to the design of its "Crown RE", mounted on a Spartan Motors chassis.  The Crown RE was the first rear-engine school bus to feature an option of a conventional rear emergency door instead of an emergency exit window typical on rear-engine school buses.  To make this possible, the floor was slanted up in the last few rows in order to gain height over the engine compartment.  Crown by Carpenter also produced a delivery truck loosely derived from its "Cadet" Type B school bus line.

Carpenter (2000–01)
In 1998, Carpenter was sold to Spartan Motors, a Michigan-based manufacturer of chassis for fire apparatus and high-end recreational vehicles. Nevertheless, major outside forces still to be faced were a supply of suitable chassis and the overcapacity of the body industry.
After four years, Carpenter had decided to phase out the Crown name in favor of a return to just Carpenter.  In a decision to focus its energy on full-size bus production, the aging Cadet and Classmate DRW were discontinued and the joint venture with Corbeil that created the Classmate SRW was ended.  In response, the newly rebranded Carpenter introduced an all-new conventional and front-engine transit for 2000.

Dubbed the Classic 2000, the all-new conventional featured a structural redesign distinguished by a fully vertical rear body, enlarged rear emergency doors, entry doors, a redesigned windshield, and an all-new drivers area (sharing nearly all its controls with the Wayne Lifeguard).  In place of the Crown FE was the Carpenter Chancellor.  Initially introduced as a front-engine transit, the Spartan-chassis Chancellor featured all of the structural changes of the Classic 2000.

Carpenter Chancellor RE
Intended as the flagship of the new Carpenter product lineup, the 2001 Chancellor RE rear-engine Type D (transit-style) school bus was built on a Spartan Motors chassis.  Its chassis featured full air-ride suspension and double frame rails for a ride similar to a motorcoach; a flat floor inside the bus was created from the double frame as well as from the fitment of smaller-diameter wheels (19" vs. the standard 22.5").  Unlike its Crown RE predecessor, the Chancellor RE did not feature an option for a rear emergency door, opting instead for a window emergency exit traditionally seen on rear-engine school buses.

The combination of the Spartan Motors chassis with the Carpenter Chancellor body resembled (in some aspects) the massive workhorses built in California by Crown and Gillig in years past, many of which stayed in service for 25 years or longer.  Only a single prototype was completed with a second bare chassis intended for display purposes.   From all reports, the Chancellor was well-received, incorporating many components and features long desired by school bus operating and maintenance personnel.

In the context of the school bus industry, the Spartan Motors chassis was in reality a premium option, incorporating many of the features long sought in a school bus.  However, there were several downsides to this approach which proved fatal to the effort. As one might reasonably anticipate, the extra durability came with added cost.  Also, Spartan had been serving lower quantity and higher margin markets for similar products used for high-end Class A motor homes as well as fire and rescue apparatus.  Although Spartan had entered the school bus market through supplying Carpenter (for nearly a decade), their production facilities were not geared up to produce a large volume under low pricing pressures, even though their products would have proved more durable in the long run.  As such, Carpenter was no longer able to compete with AmTran, Blue Bird, or Thomas on price.

This was a familiar dilemma, the same one which earlier had helped seal the fate of the Crown and Gillig coaches on the West Coast, as well as the entry of competitor Blue Bird into the mass-transit market during the 1970s.  It was also similar to the situation which faced HARSCO BMY (parent company of Wayne Wheeled Vehicles) operation some years earlier, where a lesser quantity of higher quality products (at a correspondingly higher price) had also been the plant's historical output.

Closure

Carpenter had been struggling for almost 20 years when it ended school bus production in 2001.  During the economic times around the millennium, lower initial capital costs seemed to trump longevity as a selling factor.  When it was time for purchasing decisions, financially pressed districts and contractors tended to select lower-cost products with shorter life cycles.  Spartan Motors, by then the ⅔ owner of the company, did not see a solution to the market dilemma and felt the projected continued losses would exceed the value to their business plan, voted to end its venture.

Epilogue: Body structure concerns

On March 20, 2003 in Alachua County, Florida, a Carpenter school bus rolled over onto its roof.  At the time of the accident, no passengers were on board and the driver survived the accident.  In the rollover of the bus, the internal roof structure failed, causing much of the roof to collapse down to the level of the seats.  Following the 2003 rollover accident, subsequent inspections of Carpenter school buses by operators in various parts of the United States revealed cracked and broken welds in their roof structures; the problem was not unique to the vehicle involved in the rollover crash.

In the initial investigation, the problem of cracked and broken roof welds were found in each type of Carpenter buses built at the Mitchell, Indiana facility prior to its 1995 closure.  Crown by Carpenter buses and Carpenter buses built in Richmond, Indiana from 1996 to 2001 (which used a different design for its roof structure) were not found to have any issues with cracked or broken roof welds.

In a normal case, the National Highway Traffic Safety Administration (NHTSA) would have used the findings as part of a full-scale investigation.  If the findings found any kind of manufacturers defect, a safety recall of the vehicles involved would be ordered by NHTSA.  As Carpenter was no longer in existence, that procedure was impossible, as there would be no one for NHTSA to hold accountable for the design problem.

In June 2003, NHTSA introduced several advisories regarding Carpenter buses.  As NHTSA could not offer its own recall due to the lack of a manufacturer and remained concerned about the problem, operators were recommended to inspect their own buses for cracked and broken welds in the roof structure.

In its 2003 advisories, if a Carpenter bus was found with cracked or broken roof welds, NHTSA recommended replacement of the bus; if not practical, repair of the problem and restriction of the bus to low-speed routes to minimize the chance of rollover.  To avoid resale of affected vehicles to the public, NHTSA advised that the title of Carpenter buses removed from service to be branded as "scrap".

Products
Carpenter produced a product lineup of both small and full-size buses.  Like other school bus manufacturers, the company also produced commercial, shuttle, and transit bus derivatives of their school bus designs.  The Carpenter Cadet, introduced in 1969, was one of the first Type B school buses; during the Crown by Carpenter era, a modified version of the Cadet was marketed as a delivery van.

With the exception of "Classic", its Type C conventional and "Coach", its Type D rear-engine transit style (influenced by Crown Coach), most Carpenter school buses derived their model names from themes in education (Classmate, Cadet, Counselor, Chancellor) while many transit-style Carpenters derived their model names from common team names (Corsair, Cavalier).

Survivors

The Smithsonian Institution's National Museum of American History in Washington, DC has a thirty-six passenger school bus built by Carpenter Body Works in 1936 on a chassis made by Dodge in 1939.  The bus carried students to the grade school in Martinsburg, Indiana from 1940 to 1946, and was owned and driven by Russell Bishop during that period. It was later used as a traveling grocery store until 1962.

The bus has a streamlined steel body painted double-deep or "Omaha" orange with black trim. It was restored by Carpenter in the early 1980s under the supervision of Ollie Eager, who was Carpenter's plant manager in 1936, and John Foddrill, who worked in the Carpenter plant in 1936. The bus has replacement seats that do not match the originals exactly. The originals were black upholstery.

References

- Carpenter history on coachbuilt.com

External links

David Miller Article on closure of Carpenter Bus plant
Wayne County Historical Museum - main page

Defunct bus manufacturers of the United States
School bus manufacturers
Manufacturing companies based in Indiana
Vehicle manufacturing companies established in 1919
Defunct companies based in Indiana